is a Japanese free announcer. She is a former announcer for Fuji Television. Her real name is  née . She is nicknamed . She grew up in Yokohama, Kanagawa Prefecture and Chicago. She graduated from Keio University College of Commerce.

Awards

Appearances in Fuji TV career

Current appearances

Former appearances

Television

Radio

Dubbing

Advertisements

Serialisations

Magazines

Books

See also
Tamori (co-starred with in Waratte Iitomo!)

References

External links
 
 (November 2012 –) 

Japanese announcers
Japanese television personalities
People from Yokohama
1976 births
Living people
Keio University alumni